Roger Henri Louise Lievin Constance Charlier (10 November 1921, Antwerp, Belgium – 16 September 2018, Etterbeek, Belgium) was a Belgian resistance fighter, member of the prosecuting team at the Nuremberg trials, and oceanographer. His marriage to American Captain Marie Helen Glennon and administrative difficulties regarding his residency in the US was dramatised in the film I Was a Male War Bride, with Cary Grant as Charlier.

Early life and Second World War 
Charlier's paternal grandparents were from Wallonia and his maternal grandparents were from Flanders. He started out as a teacher at a secondary school in the early 1940s. During the Second World War, he was commissioned on 15 February 1945 and demobilised on 31 October 1945. He was briefly imprisoned by the Germans. After his release, he commanded a unit in Limburg. Working for the Belgian Ministry of Justice, he became a member of the prosecuting team for the Belgian and Luxembourg delegation to the Nuremberg trials, interrogating, among others, Eggert Reeder and Alexander von Falkenhausen. Furthermore, he was a newspaper correspondent, including an editor at De Volksgazet (1949).

Career 

He became deputy-director to the United Nations Relief and Rehabilitation Administration (UNRRA), managing a refugee camp in Ansbach, near Nuremberg. Around this time, he met and married American army nurse Captain Marie Helen Glennon. This marriage was highly uncommon, since more American male soldiers married European women. The American consul in Frankfurt advised Charlier that "spouse" could mean bride as well as groom, which helped to regularise his situation. Charlier wrote a book about this episode of his life under a pen name, Henri Rochard. The Hollywood film I Was a Male War Bride was based on this autobiography. The famous scene where Charlier, played by Cary Grant, impersonates a female army nurse, was however not a historically correct scene. Glennon died after ten years of marriage. The couple had no children. Later, he married Patricia Mary Simonet, with whom he had two children.

The largest part of his almost eight-decades spanning career was marked by teaching and research activities in oceanography and earth sciences. Charlier was early in drawing attention to global warming, promoting sustainable energy production and equitable use of marine resources. Charlier has taught as a professor, visiting professor, and research scholar at many universities in the US, France, and Belgium, including at Finch College (1958—1983), Northeastern Illinois University (1961—1986), and the University of Bordeaux (1972—1975). He retired in 1989, but wrote several publications during his retirement. He died on 16 September 2018 in Etterbeek, Belgium.

Publications

Books

Journal articles

References

1921 births
2018 deaths
Belgian emigrants to the United States
Belgian resistance members
University of Erlangen-Nuremberg alumni
University of Paris alumni
Oceanographers
Prosecutors of the International Military Tribunal in Nuremberg
Belgian expatriates in France